Hettner is a surname. Notable people with the surname include:

 Alfred Hettner (1859–1941), German geographer
 Hermann Theodor Hettner (1821–1882), German historian
 Otto Hettner (1875–1931), German painter, illustrator, engraver, and sculptor
 Sabine Hettner (1907–1985), French modernist painter